The following is a list of characters that first appeared in the ITV soap opera Coronation Street in 1996, by order of first appearance.

Stephen Reid

Stephen Reid (also Potter) is the son of Audrey Roberts (Sue Nicholls), whom her father insisted she gave up for adoption after she gave birth to him when she was 16 years old. Malcolm Reid (Shane Rimmer), a neighbour and old boyfriend of Audrey, adopted Stephen and later emigrated to Canada.

In January 1996, Stephen arrives in Weatherfield to get to know his biological mother and carry out some business for his firm KBec with local tycoon Mike Baldwin (Johnny Briggs). During his stay, Mike's wife and Audrey's best friend, Alma Baldwin (Amanda Barrie) becomes besotted by him and makes her feelings clear but Stephen is not interested and returned to Canada once his work is completed. Stephen's nephew, Nick Tilsley (Adam Rickitt), later goes to stay with his uncle in Canada for several months when he  becomes troublesome towards his mother, Stephen's half-sister Gail Platt (Helen Worth) and adoptive father Martin Platt (Sean Wilson). In 1999, following the break-up of his marriage to Leanne Battersby (Jane Danson), Nick again turns to Stephen, who offers him a job in Canada. Over the years, Audrey has maintained regular contact with Stephen and has even visited him a number of times. Gail's third husband Richard Hillman (Brian Capron) also takes her to Canada for an impromptu visit at Christmas 2001.

On 10 December 2007, Stephen returns to Weatherfield to spend Christmas with Audrey en route to Italy, from where he intends to expand his business empire into Europe. On 14 December, Stephen invites his youngest nephew David Platt (Jack P. Shepherd) to join him in his Italian home and he accepts, to the disappointment of his niece and David's half-sister Sarah Platt (Tina O'Brien). On 21 December David's ambitions are ruined when Sarah buys some ecstasy tablets from a drug dealer in Leanne's restaurant Valandros and plants them in David's drawer in Audrey's Salon. Audrey opens the drawer and discovers the pills. After deciding David is too much of a troublemaker, Stephen leaves Weatherfield on Boxing Day and is joined by Sarah and her daughter Bethany (Emily Walton) four days later. Gail visits them in June 2008. In 2015, he fires Sarah over the phone when she fails to email him an urgent report.

In 2022, it was reported that Stephen would return as part of a "long term" story.In September 2022, Stephen accidentally murders Jenny Connors boyfriend, Leo Thompkins after the latter confronted him about his true financial situation. Boyce reprised his role in the episode broadcast on 24 June 2022.

Kelly Thomson

Kelly Thomson was played by Sarah Moffett. Kelly first appears on 9 February 1996 when Ken Barlow (William Roache) hires her as a child minder for his son Daniel Osbourne (Lewis Harney). She later moves in with the family, and begins a relationship with Ashley Peacock (Steven Arnold) which ends later in the year when she agrees to follow Daniel and his mother Denise (Denise Black) up to Scotland to continue with her job but now working for Denise instead of Ken.

Joyce Smedley

Joyce Smedley was played by Anita Carey. Joyce is introduced in February as the mother of Judy Mallett (Gaynor Faye). Joyce takes a job as a cleaner at The Rovers Return Inn and becomes a love interest to both Alec Gilroy (Roy Barraclough) and Percy Sugden (Bill Waddington), although she did not encourage Percy. In February 1997, whilst walking her dog, Scamper, Joyce was run over and killed by a car driven by Tony Horrocks (Lee Warburton).

Claire Palmer

Claire Palmer is the girlfriend of Des Barnes (Phillip Middlemiss), who first appeared on 8 May 1996 played by Maggie Norris. Des and Claire have a whirlwind romance, and she moves in with him two months later, despite still claiming her dead husband's R.A.F. pension. The Palmers are forced to move out again to avoid being found out, but by the end of the year, Claire gives up the pension for Des. A few months later however, Claire sees Des make a pass at Samantha Failsworth (Tina Hobley) and immediately packs her bags and leaves.

Becky Palmer

Rebecca "Becky" Palmer is the daughter of Claire Palmer (Maggie Norris), and first appears on 20 May 1996 played by Emily Aston. Becky moves to the Street when her mother meets Des Barnes (Phillip Middlemiss) at the market and they begin a relationship. When Des and Claire split up the following year, Becky moves away with her mother.

Samantha Failsworth

Samantha Failsworth (previously Fitzgerald) is played by Tina Hobley. Samantha makes her first appearance on 17 July 1996 when she asks landlord Jack Duckworth for a job in the Rovers Return. Jack likes the look of her, and without his wife Vera's approval, he takes her on. When Vera returns she is furious, but Samantha wins her over referring to Vera as the boss rather than Jack. Samantha later moves into the Street, house-sharing with newly single Curly Watts and after ending Des Barnes's relationship with Claire Palmer, she begins dating Des.

In late 1997, Samantha's estranged husband Ritchie Fitzgerald turned up hoping for a reconciliation. Instead he faced months of Samantha claiming their marriage is dead, before spending the night together behind Des's back. Nevertheless, Samantha went ahead with divorce proceedings until Des found out and Samantha was again undecided of which man to choose. Ritchie gave up on his marriage and Des forgave her until she again cheated on him with mechanic Chris Collins in 1998.

Following their split, Des became close to Natalie Horrocks and Samantha was envious. She told them that she was pregnant with Des's child, then said she had an abortion. It was eventually revealed that there had been no baby to begin with, but Samantha went back on her lies and maintained she had suffered a miscarriage. In the end, Samantha told Des she was still pregnant with his child and left Weatherfield in June 1998. Although Natalie firmly believed she was lying, Des was never sure, and Samantha was never heard from again.

Robert Preston

Robert Preston made his first screen appearance on 11 November 1996. The character was played by Julian Kay from his introduction until 2003 and by Tristan Gemmill from 2015 to 2019.

On 6 April 2015, it was announced that Robert would be returning to Coronation Street later in the year. According to The Sun an actor had yet to be cast but producers were looking for someone around the age of 35. On 10 May, it was confirmed that Tristan Gemmill had been cast in the role. Gemmill has been contracted for a year and he commented, "I'm excited to be joining such an iconic show. Coronation Street is a great British institution and it will be a huge challenge to meet the expectations of its devoted audience. But it is a challenge I am really looking forward to." Robert returned for the funeral of Deirdre Barlow (Anne Kirkbride).

On 26 April 2019, Gemmill announced that after 4 years playing Robert, he will be leaving the show later that year. It was later confirmed that Robert would be killed-off as part of a Christmas storyline.

Robert is the fiancé of Tracy Barlow (Dawn Acton). In 1996, Deirdre and Ken meet Robert Preston, their future son-in-law, and take to him. Shirley (Maggie Tagney) and Maurice Preston (Seamus O'Neill) have tea with the Barlows and Robert. Tracy is nervous to meet her new in-laws and Ken is put out when working-class Maurice takes against him for being a teacher. Deirdre is upset when the Prestons tell her that they don't want Robert to marry Tracy as he's on the rebound. Eventually, the wedding day arrives. Maurice Preston tells the Barlows that Robert and his best man, Paul Davies, have disappeared and never returned from the stag night. He thinks Robert has changed his mind about marrying Tracy but she is adamant he'll turn up. Ken and Deirdre try to find Robert. One of his friends, Greg, remembers locking him in a container in a freight yard. They go to look for him but all the containers are empty apart from two sealed ones that are on their way to Saudi Arabia. Deirdre has to stop herself from going for Greg. The police are called in to stop the shipment, fearing Robert could have suffocated. Ken and Deirdre return home to find Robert there, being shouted at by Tracy for seeing her before the service. He explains he let himself out of the container. Tracy and Robert are married, afterwards Ken makes a speech and Percy produces the wedding cake. After the wedding in 1996, Robert doesn't appear for three years.

Robert returns in March 1999 - after Tracy goes on a spending spree using his credit card. Ken is shocked when Robert turns up, demanding to see Tracy. He explains he caught Tracy kissing another man. Ken refuses to tell him where Tracy is but lets him stay the night. Tracy refuses to explain herself to Robert. Ken and Deirdre succeed in getting the Prestons to sit down together and talk. They get caught in the crossfire when Robert and Tracy row about her friendship with Dan. Robert tells Ken that his marriage is obviously over. Tracy admits to Deirdre that Dan did want an affair with her but she didn't. Deirdre urges her not to make the mistakes she's made and advises her to stick with Robert. Linda chats up Robert and is disappointed when he tells her that he's married. Tracy sees them talking and flares up at him, refusing to talk about a reconciliation. Robert leaves again and appears on the Street once more in October 1999 for Ken's sixtieth birthday party. Robert then leaves the street again, making a final appearance on 1 January 2003. Tracy (now played by Kate Ford) had returned to Weatherfield without Robert, telling Deirdre that she had found Robert in bed with her best friend. Deirdre phones Robert and asks him to come to talk to her. Robert arrives and it soon becomes clear that Tracy was lying - it was she who was caught in bed with Robert's best friend; not the other way round. Robert says their marriage is over and leaves. Tracy doesn't care when he tells her that he's going to divorce her; which he does.

Twelve years later, in 2015, Deirdre dies and Robert returns to Weatherfield for her funeral. Tracy is surprised to see Robert watching the funeral party from across the street as they leave for the church. Emily recognises Robert at the funeral. Upset, Tracy walks out of the church and Robert follows her. Robert comforts Tracy as she weeps by Blanche's grave. He tells her he came to pay his respects after reading about Deirdre's death in the paper. Steve comes out to fetch Tracy and is introduced to a fellow ex-husband of hers. Back in the street, Robert calls on Tracy at No.1 to give her company. Robert cooks a meal for Tracy. Tracy can't understand why Robert is being so nice to her. Despite his reservations, they start to kiss. Liz persuades Ken to fetch Tracy to the wake. He finds Tracy and Robert in a clinch and throws Robert out, asking Tracy how low she can get. Tony's former henchmen, Nev and Rik barge into Barlow's Buys and demand money he owes them for some foot spas from Tracy. As they turn menacing, Robert enters the shop and comes to her rescue, sending them packing. Tracy and Robert go for a drink and he tells her he now wants to be a chef. Behind her back, he takes a mobile phone call and tells the ringer a series of lies as to where he's been. Robert tells Tracy how he's never stopped loving her but she tells him her head's in bits as it is without this.

Robert apologises to Ken for his behaviour after the funeral. Spotting Deirdre's stuffed marrow recipe on the table, he offers to cook it for him and Tracy. Ken and Tracy admit that Robert's stuffed marrow is better than Deirdre's. Ken and Tracy are bored as they sort through Deirdre's paperwork. Tracy is pleased when Robert invites them to a trade fair. Tracy and Robert have wine at No.1, unaware of the visit of Robert's wife, Joni. Ken passes on Joni's message to Robert. He tells Tracy she manages his restaurant. Tony advises Robert to run a mile from Tracy. Ken is pleased that Tracy and Robert have got back together and compares them to him and Deirdre. At the restaurant, Joni apologises to Robert, who hides his guilt. When Tracy gets a text from Robert cancelling their evening together as he has to work, Beth suggests they visit him. But in 2017, he got a new woman in his life in Steve McDonald's soon-to-be-ex-wife, Michelle Connor, and they became a romantic couple, then he wants her to divorce Steve, and move in with him for romance and business.

In 2019, Robert cheated on Michelle by having an affair with local resident Vicky Jefferies (Kerri Quinn) - who later fell pregnant and gave birth to their son Sonny. However, Robert never got the chance to know his son. He was hospitalized on Christmas Day that year after being shot by Derek Milligan (Craige Els) - a client of local builder Gary Windass (Mikey North), whom he sought to kill for ruining his chances of reconciling with his family. After apologizing to Michelle for cheating on her and despite his efforts for recovery, Robert died from his gunshot injury in hospital after going into cardiac arrest since he had heart issues in the past.

Others

References

1996
, Coronation Street
Coronation Street